Thomas Hammond (1630 – April 1681) was an English-born, Norwegian merchant and landowner.

Hammond  was born in Suffolk, England to landowner Edward Hammond (c.1595–c.1660). Hammond settled in Trondheim,  following a growing timber trade between Norway and England. He eventually acquired land properties and forests, and was among the large merchants in Trondheim in the 17th century. 
He ran a lumber trading business and held agriculture and forests in central and northern Norway. He also ran a sawmill with wood from its own forests.

He married Elisabeth Henriksdatter Sommerschild  (1635-1682) who was the daughter of another English immigrant, Henrik Sommerschild (1584-1664).  They had seven children including Sara Hammond who married Albert Angell. They were the parents of Thomas Angell. Thomas Hammond perished during the 1681 Trondheim fire (18–19 April 1681) His wife died the following year.

References

1630 births
1681 deaths
Businesspeople from Suffolk
17th-century English businesspeople
17th-century Norwegian businesspeople
Norwegian landowners
Deaths from fire
Accidental deaths in Norway
English emigrants to Norway
Businesspeople from Trondheim